"Crystal" is a song by English rock band New Order. The song was released on 13 August 2001 as the first single from their seventh studio album, Get Ready (2001). It entered the UK Singles Chart at number eight, attracting considerable attention and critical praise as the band's comeback single, their first original since 1993. The song also found success internationally, peaking at number three in Canada, number seven in Finland, and reaching the top 50 in Germany, Ireland, Italy, and Sweden.

"Crystal" appears as the first track on the album in a different version than the single release, with an extended intro and coda.

Release
Singer-guitarist Bernard Sumner originally gave the song to German record label Mastermind for Success, and it was recorded by label artist Corvin Dalek. However, DJ Pete Tong heard the song and declared it to be the best New Order single since "Blue Monday", leading Sumner to reconsider the gift and have New Order record and release it.

A version of the single was also released in Japan to promote the release of the New Order DVD 316, and has a different cover that resembles the 316 cover. B-sides for the single were 4 live audio tracks taken from the DVD. The single was B-sided by a variety of remixes, and an original song titled "Behind Closed Doors". All versions feature extensive backing vocals from Dawn Zee, mostly wordless. Zee has continued to perform with New Order on all their successive studio albums.

After the song was released, a remix contest was held in which there were thousands of entries around the world.

Critical reception
Joe Tangari of Pitchfork called the song as "possibly one of New Order's best singles". Drowned in Sound rated it a 9/10 and described it as "fantastic" and the "confident, strutting return of a band that knows that the music industry has missed it." Stereogum placed the song at number ten in the list of their top ten best New Order songs.

Promotion
The main music video, set to the album version, was directed by Johan Renck, produced by Nicola Doring through London production company Jane Fuller Associates and cinematographed by Fredrik Callinggård. It does not feature New Order; instead, it depicts a younger band miming to New Order's music and words. At the end, a large number of people come on stage to pull them off-stage.

The fictional band is named "The Killers" (the name appears on the bass drum in the video). This name later inspired a real band of the same name, who lifted a number of elements of the layout of the set in the "Crystal" video for their own video "Somebody Told Me". In 2005, at Scotland's T in the Park festival, New Order performed the song with The Killers' frontman Brandon Flowers singing the main vocals in a guest performance.  In 2013, at a gig in Manchester, Bernard Sumner joined The Killers onstage to perform the song. Also, in 2013 Brandon Flowers joined New Order in Bogota, Colombia, to perform this song. When The Killers were on-stage, Sumner joined them to play "Shadowplay", a Joy Division song covered by The Killers. Additionally, in March 2016, at The Chelsea at The Cosmopolitan in Las Vegas, New Order performed "Crystal" with The Killers' frontman Brandon Flowers singing the main vocals in a guest performance.

The DVD single contains an alternate music video, set to the "Special Circumstances Mix (Digweed & Muir Bedrock Radio Edit)" of the song. Directed and produced by Gina Birch and Simon Tyszko, the video depicts a motorcycle ride through city streets at night, viewed through two side-by-side shots filmed with sub miniature video cameras mounted in boots.

The cover art for the CD and DVD shows actress and model Nicolette Krebitz with her trousers below her knees.

Track listings

 Numerous "Crystal" 12-inch records were released, with the Bedrock, Lee Coombs and John Creamer & Stephane K remixes each released on individual 12-inch singles.

Charts

Weekly charts

Year-end charts

Release history

References

2001 singles
2001 songs
The Killers
London Records singles
Music videos directed by Johan Renck
New Order (band) songs
Reprise Records singles